The Inter-Collegiate Sailing Association (ICSA) is a volunteer organization that serves as the governing authority for all sailing competition at colleges and universities throughout the United States and in some parts of Canada.

History
The first college sailing club to be formed in the United States was the Yale Corinthian Yacht Club, established in Branford, Connecticut in 1881, three years before the founding of the Oxford University Yacht Club in the United Kingdom in 1884 (followed by Cambridge University Yacht Club in 1893, Harvard University Yacht Club in 1894, and Brown University Yacht Club in 1896). Harvard and Yale held a sailing event in 1911, but this was a long-distance 'cruise' rather than a fleet or team race, and only one Yale yacht attended the event. Organized intercollegiate fleet racing began in 1928 between just a few schools in Eight-Metres for the Oliver Hay Trophy, what is now the McMillan Cup. 

The Inter-Collegiate Sailing Association (ICSA) was formed June 16th, 1930, as the Inter-Collegiate Yacht Racing Association (ICYRA). 

The first inter-collegiate dinghy fleet event, the Boston Dinghy Club Challenge Cup, took place with 34 entrants in 1930 (in parallel with the founding of the ICYRA), and there was also a dinghy event between Princeton and Dartmouth in 1934, but details of its format are not recorded.

The initial emphasis of the ICSA was very much on fleet racing, rather than team racing, but during the 1930s, team racing between individual colleges started to emerge, with 2 to 4 colleges meeting up, each fielding 2 to 5 boats. Collegiate dinghy sailing blossomed in 1934–36 with initiatives taken by Princeton with its 'Tiger' dinghies (1934), MIT (the famous Pavilion was founded and built in 1935 at the instigation of Walter C. "Jack" Wood), and Brown (1936). The first ICSA dinghy fleet regatta took place in the spring of 1937 at the MIT Pavilion and was won by MIT, with Brown, Cornell, Harvard, Princeton, Williams, and Yale also competing.  In the fall of the same year (1937) no less than 19 colleges took part in another ICSA dinghy regatta at the MIT Pavilion. The coveted Morss Trophy was also first awarded in 1937, being won by MIT 

After World War II collegiate sailing spread across the US and parts of Canada, with ICSA membership rapidly growing to modern numbers. George O’Day (Harvard), Harry Anderson (Yale) and Bill Cox Sr. (Princeton) helped develop the ICYRA team race rules in the 1940s, and these were the forerunners of the NAYRU (now US Sailing) and International Yacht Racing Union (later International Sailing Federation) team race rules.

A regional team racing championship, four-a-side format, first took place in 1950 in the New England District for the Leonard M. Fowle Trophy, a separate trophy from the new Fowle Trophy that is awarded to the best overall collegiate team. National team racing for the Walter Cromwell Wood Bowl, four-a-side format, commenced in 1970 between teams formed with sailors within a particular ICSA district or 'conference', and, since 1977, individuals from one college. The University of Rhode Island was the first winner of the current team racing championship in 1977.

In 2011, a group of Canadian University teams formed the Canadian Intercollegiate Sailing Association (CICSA), based on the ICSA's model.  CICSA's two most successful teams, Queen's University and McGill University, also compete in the ICSA.

Teams
35 schools launch fully funded varsity teams, while the other 163 are club teams.
Varsity teams are:

Structure
There are 7 conferences with 200 teams competing in college sailing. The conferences within ICSA schedule and administer regattas within their established regions:
Middle Atlantic Intercollegiate Sailing Association (MAISA)
Midwest Collegiate Sailing Association (MCSA)
New England Intercollegiate Sailing Association (NEISA)
Northwest Intercollegiate Sailing Association (NWICSA)
Pacific Coast Collegiate Sailing Conference (PCCSC)
South Atlantic Intercollegiate Sailing Association (SAISA)
Southeastern Intercollegiate Sailing Association (SEISA)

Each conference is supervised by a Graduate Secretary and an Executive Committee, which comprises both graduate and undergraduate students. Both the Graduate Secretary and the Executive Committee are elected by representatives from each school in the conference. Each conference conducts local and intersectional regattas and holds district championships in both the fall and the spring.

Championships

The conference or district championships allow schools to qualify for the Intercollegiate Sailing Association National Championships.

ICSA College Sailing Hall of Fame
The ICSA College Sailing Hall of Fame was established in 1969. The Hall of Fame is located in the Robert Crown Sailing Center at the United States Naval Academy in Annapolis, Maryland.

ICSA Hall of Fame Awards
There are several awards that are bestowed upon collegiate sailors at the end of every full racing season:
Competitors Division
College Sailor of the Year
Women’s College Sailor of the Year
All American Skipper
All American Woman Skipper
All American Crew
Academic All-American Team
Jim Rousmaniere Student Leadership Award
Robert H. Hobbs Sportsmanship Award
Afterguard Division
Campbell Family Award for Lifetime Service
Graham Hall Award for Outstanding Service by a College Sailing Professional
Outstanding Service by a Volunteer Award
Meritorious Service Award

Participation
ICSA seeks to promote the sport of sailing throughout North America and encourage participation in the sport among young people. Although both varsity and club teams compete fiercely to qualify for district championships and nationals, the overall goal is to promote sailing and have fun on the water. Thus, most college sailing programs do not require previous sailing experience and encourage widespread participation among students. However, most schools also value students who have high school sailing experience.

Instruction
As education and training have been two cornerstones of the ICSA since its inception most college sailing programs offer general instruction to the student body, and in some cases the general public. Often college sailing programs serve to introduce many people to the sport of sailing.

Many college sailors have gone on to race in the America's Cup as well as in the Olympics.

Corporate partners
Vanguard Sailboats was an official partner of ICSA for many years and the boatbuilder annually sponsored the ICSA National Championships. More recently, LaserPerformance has been the official sponsor.

References

External links